Robert Dabou (born 10 November 1990) is a Ghanaian footballer who plays for the Ghana Premier League side Ashanti Gold as a goalkeeper.

Career 
Dabou began his career at All Stars F.C. Before being promoted to the first team, he played his first game in 2007 for the squad.

International 
Dabuo was a member of the Ghana national under-17 football team in 2007 FIFA U-17 World Cup in Korea Republic. On 19 August 2008, Dabuo was called up to the Satellites, and was part of the Ghana national under-20 football team that won the 2009 FIFA U-20 World Cup in Egypt.

Titles and Honours

International
Ghana U-20
 FIFA U-20 World Cup Champion: 2009

Trivia 
 Fifa Profile

References 

1990 births
Living people
Ghanaian footballers
Ghana under-20 international footballers
Association football goalkeepers
Legon Cities FC players
Ashanti Gold SC players